Mess Mates is a British comedy television series which originally aired on ITV between 1960 and 1962. It is set on the coastal vessel SS Guernsey where Captain Briskett has to keep a watchful eye on his rowdy and conniving sailors. A number of the scripts were written by Talbot Rothwell shortly before he became the established writer of the Carry On film series.

Cast

Main
 Archie Duncan as Captain Biskett
 Sam Kydd as 'Croaker' Jones
 Ronald Hines as 'Dapper' Drake
 Dermot Kelly as Blarney Finnigan
 Fulton Mackay as Willie McGuinniss
 Victor Maddern as 'Tug' Nelson
 Frank Atkinson as  'Fry-Up' Dodds
 Michael Balfour as  'Twinkle' Martin

References

Bibliography
 Wagg, Stephen. Because I Tell a Joke or Two: Comedy, Politics and Social Difference. Routledge, 2004.

External links
 

1960 British television series debuts
1962 British television series endings
1960s British comedy television series
ITV sitcoms
English-language television shows
Television shows produced by Granada Television